The women's 400 metre freestyle was a swimming event held as part of the swimming at the 1936 Summer Olympics programme. It was the fourth appearance of the event, which was established in 1924 after 1920 a 300 metre event was held. The competition was held from Thursday to Saturday, 13 to 15 August 1936.

Twenty swimmers from ten nations competed.

Medalists

Records
These were the standing world and Olympic records (in minutes) prior to the 1936 Summer Olympics.

Ragnhild Hveger set a new Olympic record in the first heat with 5:28.0 minutes. In the final Rie Mastenbroek bettered the Olympic record with 5:26.4 minutes.

Results

Heats

Thursday 13 August 1936: The fastest three in each heat and the fastest fourth-placed from across the heats advanced to the semi-finals. Only two swimmers competed in heat two therefore only 15 swimmers advanced to the semi-finals.

Heat 1

Heat 2

Heat 3

Heat 4

Heat 5

Semifinals

Friday 14 August 1936: The fastest three in each semi-final and the fastest fourth-placed from across the heats advanced to the final. As both fourth placed swimmers set the same time both advanced to the final.

Semifinal 1

Semifinal 2

Final

Saturday 15 August 1936:

References

External links
Olympic Report
 

Swimming at the 1936 Summer Olympics
1936 in women's swimming
Swim